Kenneth Terence Solomon (born 8 October 1979) is a South African chess Grandmaster. He is the first and currently the only Grandmaster South Africa has ever produced.

He took up chess at the age of 13, inspired by his elder brother's qualification for the Chess Olympiad in Manila in 1992. Borrowing a chess book from him to study, Solomon was soon taken under his brother's wing to study and within two years, he was the South African Under-16 champion.

He has won the South African Championship in 2003 and the South African Open three times, in 1999, 2005 and 2007, and was also the top ranked South African in 2003. He became an International Master in 2004. During the 40th Chess Olympiad in Istanbul Solomon earned his final GM norm.

Although Solomon has never reached the rating of 2500 that is usually required for the Grandmaster title, a special FIDE rule allows winners of continental championships to earn the title regardless of rating, and he did so by winning the African Chess Championship in December 2014. This made him the first chess grandmaster from South Africa, the second grandmaster from sub-Saharian Africa after Amon Simutowe of Zambia, and the fourth black chess grandmaster in history.

He qualified for the 2017 Chess World Cup where he was defeated by Fabiano Caruana in the first round.

See also
 Chess in South Africa

References

External links
Kenny Solomon's website

Kenny Solomon chess games at 365Chess.com

1979 births
Living people
Chess grandmasters
South African chess players
Chess Olympiad competitors
People from Cape Town